Yavatmal Lok Sabha constituency (formerly known as Yeotmal Lok Sabha constituency) was one of the 48 Lok Sabha (parliamentary) constituencies of Maharashtra state in western India. This constituency was spread over Yavatmal and Chandrapur districts. In 2008, constituency borders were re-drawn.

Vidhan Sabha segments
Presently, the Yavatmal–Washim Lok Sabha constituency comprises six Vidhan Sabha (or "legislative assembly") segments:

Members of Parliament

References

Former Lok Sabha constituencies of Maharashtra
Yavatmal district
Former constituencies of the Lok Sabha
2008 disestablishments in India
Constituencies disestablished in 2008
Chandrapur district